Kaingaroa Forest covers  of the Bay of Plenty Region of New Zealand, and is the largest forest plantation in New Zealand, and the second largest in the Southern Hemisphere (after the  Sabie/Graskop plantation in South Africa). The forest stretches from Lake Taupō in the south to Kawerau to the north.

The New Zealand Ministry for Culture and Heritage gives a translation of "long area of land" for Kāingaroa. 

The forest was first planted in the late 1920s and owned as a state asset by the New Zealand government. Experimental planting of douglas fir and radiata pine began on a  block at Kaingaroa in 1901 and continued from 1906 using Waiotapu prison labour. Later planting was as an unemployment relief scheme. While under government control it was known as the Kaingaroa State Forest.

In the 1980s the government sought to sell the forests to private interests. Several Māori iwi went to Court to prevent the sale, arguing that they were the traditional owners of the land, that the land had been wrongfully taken from them, and that the government should retain the land until a settlement of the claims had been reached. It has taken 20 years to reach settlement of those claims and to see the forest lands returned to their traditional owners. On 1 July 2009, it passed to a group of tribes that were the traditional land owners in partial settlement of their claims that the Crown breached the Treaty of Waitangi.  The forests themselves (the trees) continue to be owned by a private company (Kaingaroa Timberlands Ltd), which holds a forestry licence over the land.

New Zealand State Highway 38, from Wai-O-Tapu to Murupara crosses the forest.

References

External links 
 1:50,000 map of forest village
 Kaingaroa Forest on Google maps
 Tephra soils

Photos
 1903 Kaingaroa Plain and mud covered ridges from the 1886 Tarawera eruption
 1925 ploughing
 1961 bulldozer
 1963 aerial view
 1976 aerial view of settlement

Rotorua Lakes District
Forests of New Zealand
Forestry in New Zealand
Geography of the Bay of Plenty Region
Populated places in the Bay of Plenty Region